James Matthew Culbertson Sr. (July 19, 1901 – August 27, 1994) was an American football coach and athletic director. A member of the Choctaw Nation, he served as the head football coach at Southeastern State Teachers College—now known as Southeastern Oklahoma State University—from 1935 to 1938, compiling a record of 15–22–2.

Head coaching record

References

External links
 

1901 births
1994 deaths
Rhodes Lynx football players
Southeastern Oklahoma State Savage Storm football coaches
People from Le Flore County, Oklahoma
Coaches of American football from Oklahoma
Players of American football from Oklahoma